Solapur City North Assembly constituency (248) is one of the 288 Vidhan Sabha (legislative assembly) constituencies of Maharashtra state, western India. This constituency is located in Solapur district.

Geographical scope
.Smallest sub district in solapur

The constituency comprises ward nos. 1 to 5, 15 to 28, 48 to 49, 52 to 65, 86 to 88 of Solapur Municipal Corporation and Solapur revenue circle.

Members of Legislative Assembly

Election Results

Vidhan Sabha elections, 2019

Vidhan Sabha elections, 2014

References

Assembly constituencies of Solapur district
Solapur
Assembly constituencies of Maharashtra